The Wilson Private Explorer is an American-built recreational aircraft of the late 1990s.

Development

The Private Explorer was designed by Dean Wilson as a scaled-down single-engine version of his twin-engined Wilson Global Explorer. The Private Explorer is a strut braced high wing aircraft which utilises a tubular steel frame covered in fabric. The interior has four passenger seats in the front section and a rear accommodation compartment which contains a double bed and two armchairs.

The tricycle undercarriage is fixed and can be quickly removed for attachment of floats for operations off water. The aircraft has an excellent short-field performance and an endurance of up to 8 hours. The aircraft is supplied to amateur constructors in kit form. The type has been tested with a Pratt & Whitney Canada PT6 turboprop engine.

Operational history
The Private Explorer is used by individuals as an "airborne recreational vehicle" from both land and water bases. Two aircraft are currently (2010) registered in the United States.

Specifications (variant)

Notes

References

External links

Photographs of the Private Explorer

1990s United States civil utility aircraft
Homebuilt aircraft